Alberto Paulo (born 3 October 1985) is a Portuguese track and field athlete who mainly competes in the 3000 metres steeplechase.

Achievements

References

1985 births
Living people
Portuguese male middle-distance runners
Portuguese male steeplechase runners
Athletes (track and field) at the 2008 Summer Olympics
Athletes (track and field) at the 2012 Summer Olympics
Olympic athletes of Portugal
S.L. Benfica athletes
Universiade medalists in athletics (track and field)
Universiade gold medalists for Portugal
Competitors at the 2009 Summer Universiade
Medalists at the 2011 Summer Universiade